Conair Group Inc. of Abbotsford, British Columbia, Canada, formerly known as Conair Aviation, is a company specializing in retrofitting firefighting aircraft, maintaining customer and company-owned aircraft and aerial firefighting. Conair currently employs over 250 staff and has a fleet of aircraft that are broken down into two categories; air attack (a.k.a. bird dog), and airtankers (a.k.a. waterbombers). Conair specializes in fire management support by providing services and products to forest protection agencies around the world. In 1996 Conair became a Canadian Air Tractor dealer for the AT-802F air tanker. A former Conair Group division; Cascade Aerospace was acquired by the IMP Group of Halifax, Nova Scotia in 2012.

History

The company was started by a consortium led by Les Kerr consisting of: Leslie George "Les" Kerr, K. Barry Marsden, Herman Joseph "Slim" Knights, Ronald "Ron" F. Connelly of Whitehorse, Yukon, and John De Voin (a silent partner). Les Kerr had worked for Skyway Air Services for seventeen years and put together the five man group to take control of the fire control and aerial agricultural interests of Skyway. In the transaction, they took 35 employees and 19 single engine aircraft. This took place after the owner for Skyway (Art Seller), had suffered a stroke and wanted to eliminate some of his workload.

Skyway Air Services was started shortly after the close of WW2. They were pioneers in the development and operation of aerial firefighting, agricultural and pest control spraying. After the interests were sold, Skyway continued to operate as a flying school and charter business out of Langley, British Columbia.

The new company was called Conair Aviation Ltd. and was incorporated in April 1969, receiving their operating license on October 22, 1969. As part of the deal, the aircraft and assets that Conair purchased were: thirteen Grumman Avengers, five Boeing Stearmans, one North American Harvard and the existing Skyway hangar located at Abbotsford, British Columbia.
 
In 1978 Conair acquired a subsidiary; Frontier Helicopters based at Watson Lake, Yukon. This rotary division was renamed Conair Helicopters in 1999. Conair also went into the Air Cargo business in 1980 by starting a company named Swiftair Cargo. They filed for license in early July 1979, and flew for the first time on September 15, 1980 using two Douglas DC-8 aircraft flying in opposite directions across Canada. Swiftair Cargo went into receivership by May 1982.

By 1984 Conair had the world's largest private fleet of Air Tankers including 50 fixed wing aircraft and 15 helicopters and by the early 1990s has grown to over 90 aircraft. Conair Aviation Ltd. later became Conair Group Inc., and they continue to be based out of Abbotsford, British Columbia.

Fleet
As of May 2022, according to Transport Canada the Conair Group fleet numbers 59 aircraft.

The Dash 8 were originally two used Bombardier Dash 8 Q400s, acquired from Scandinavian Airlines System, that were modified by the Conair Group's former division Cascade Aerospace of Abbotsford, British Columbia. These aircraft are set up for dual roles and were modified for the Sécurité Civile to act both as fire-fighting water bombers in fire season and as civilian or cargo transport aircraft in the off season. This aircraft is designated the Q400-MR (Multi Role). The aircraft can be reconfigured into the passenger, cargo or aerial fire control role in under three hours and can drop in the tanker role.

Conair also previously converted three Fokker F27 Friendship turboprops for use as air tankers.

In January 2021, Conair announced that it had purchased 11 Q400s from defunct British airline Flybe for conversion into Q400AT and Q400MR configurations.

Air attack 

Conair's air attack aircraft, more commonly known as "bird dogs", are aircraft that contain the pilot and Air Attack Officer. The bird dogs ensure the runs to be made by the laden airtankers are safe and free of obstructions. The crew inside the bird dog determine the run locations and drop types to be made, coordinate the aerial action with the ground crews if present and control the airspace around the fire. These aircraft are always used in conjunction with the airtankers.

Former attack aircraft include the Cessna T210, Cessna Skymaster T337 and the piston 337 and Piper Aerostars, since superseded by Aero Commanders, Cessna 208 Caravans and Cessna CitationJet.

Air tankers 
Conair's tankers include Air Tractor AT-802F, and AT-802F Amphibious "Fireboss" variants, Convair CV580s, Lockheed L188 Electra, and Canadair CL-215s. Conair's headquarters are in Abbotsford at the Abbotsford International Airport which also is where their maintenance and  retrofitting facility is located. Conair bases their aircraft under contract to fire control agencies throughout western Canada and the United States. Currently, Conair airtanker groups (a group consists of one birddog and from one to four airtankers) are contracted to agencies in BC, Alberta, Yukon and Alaska. Conair serves as the Canadian dealer for Air Tractor of Olney, Texas, which produces the AT-802F, one of only three types of aircraft specifically designed for aerial firefighting (the others being the Canadair CL-415 and 215 models).

Former air tankers include Conair Firecats (retrofitted S-2 Trackers) and Douglas DC-6s.

Accidents and incidents

References

External links

Conair Group Inc. company web site

Aerial firefighting
Aerospace companies of Canada
Seaplane operators